Hans Sydow (29 January 1879 – 6 June 1946) was a German mycologist and the son of mycologist and lichenologist, Paul Sydow (1851–1925).

Career
Hans Sydow worked at the Dresdner Bank in Berlin between 1904 and 1937 rising to divisional manager in 1922. Before, during and after this time he also pursued a career as a mycologist. Together with his father he co-authored many works before his father's death in 1925, most substantial of which were four volumes of monographs on the Uredinales (now called Pucciniales),  (Monograph on the Uredinales, description of known species and outline of systematics). The first volume covered the genus Puccinia and the second the genus Uromyces. The third volume described the systematics and taxonomy used to classify the family and provided a key as well as further descriptions of other genera including Gymnosporangium and Phragmidium. The final volume published covered the related genera; Peridermium, Aecidium, Monosporidium, Roestelia, Caeoma, Uredo and Mapea.

His manuscripts and extensive collection were burned in Berlin in 1943.

Hans Sydow was founding editor of the journal , established in 1903, and he remained the journal's editor in chief until his death in 1946.

Honours
Following Sydow's death, Annales Mycologici was retitled with the prefix Sydowia in his honour. In the following issue, Franz Petrak, who had published papers with Sydow since the early 1920s, succeeded Sydow as editor in chief and published an obituary in the subsequent volume.

Several taxa of fungi were named in his honour; 
 Sydowiella (family Sydowiellaceae) by Petr. in 1923 
 Sydowina (family Fenestellaceae) by Petr. in 1923 
 Sydowinula (family Nitschkiaceae) by Petr. in 1923
 Sydowiellina (family Schizothyriaceae) by Bat. & I.H.Lima in 1959 

A subspecies of Bryum capillare received the suffix "sydowii" by Czech botanist, Josef Podpěra.

Selected publications 
 
  12 figs.
 
 
 
 
 
 
 
 
 
 
 
 
 
 
  (publ. 1927).

Books

References

External links
 

German mycologists
Scientists from Berlin
1879 births
1946 deaths